Computer tape may refer to:

Punched tape or perforated paper tape
Magnetic tape in one of several formats:
 Tape drive